Grevillea gordoniana is a species of flowering plant in the family Proteaceae and is endemic to the west of Western Australia. It is an erect shrub or small tree with cylindrical leaves and yellow to orange flowers.

Description
Grevillea gordoniana is an erect shrub or small tree that typically grows to a height of  but does not form a lignotuber.

Taxonomy
Grevillea gordoniana was first formally described by Charles Austin Gardner in 1964 in the Journal of the Royal Society of Western Australia from specimens he collected near the Murchison River. The specific epithet (gordoniana) honours David Morrice Gordon of Myall Park Botanic Garden.

Distribution and habitat
This grevillea grows in shrubland in near coastal areas of western Western Australia, between Exmouth Gulf and Yuna in the Avon Wheatbelt, Carnarvon, Geraldton Sandplains and Yalgoo biogeographic regions of Western Australia.

Conservation status
Grevillea gordoniana is classified as "not threatened" by the Government of Western Australia Department of Biodiversity, Conservation and Attractions.

See also
 List of Grevillea species

References

gordoniana
Proteales of Australia
Eudicots of Western Australia
Plants described in 1964
Taxa named by Charles Gardner